Migadopidius is a genus of ground beetles in the family Carabidae. This genus has a single species, Migadopidius bimaculatus. It is found in Chile.

References

Migadopinae